New Tredegar is a former mining town and community in the Rhymney Valley, Caerphilly county borough, Wales, within the historic boundaries of Monmouthshire.

New Tredegar is now home to 'The Winding House', a county museum which opened in 2008. It is controlled by CCBC Museums service and the Friends of the Winding House community group.

The area is rich in the mining heritage of the South Wales mining industry.
The area is supported by two primary schools; White Rose Primary school and Phillipstown Primary school.
The area also contains a number of religious buildings including; Saint Dingat's Church and the Presbyterian Church of Wales.

Along with other parts of Rhymney, New Tredegar had Welsh speakers in the community
the Welsh-only monuments in the local cemetery testify to the strength of the language locally in the first quarter of the 20th century.

Sport
Capel Golf Club, New Tredegar, (now defunct) first appeared in the mid 1930s and continued into the 1950s.

New Tredegar RFC, sits in Division 3 of Welsh Rugby Union League.

Notable people
See :Category:People from New Tredegar
Darcy Blake, professional footballer, was born in New Tredegar.
Tim Rhys-Evans, was a vocal tutor at the Royal Welsh College of Music and Drama and MBE holder
Linden Jones, professional footballer, was born in New Tredegar.
Eliot Allen Richards, professional footballer, was born in New Tredegar.
Gerald Jones, MP for Merthyr Tydfil and Rhymney

Politics
In the Caerphilly County Borough Council Elections 2017, Eluned Stenner and Anthony Evans were elected.

Businesses
New Tredegar is home to Zipline Creative, a TV production company.

AJM Sewing, one of the last UK-based underwear and swimming costume manufacturers, was based in a converted chapel in New Tredegar but went into liquidation in 2018.

References

External links
BBC Wales feature on New Tredegar

Villages in Caerphilly County Borough